John Barefield (born March 23, 1955) is a former American football linebacker. He played for the St. Louis Cardinals from 1978 to 1980.

References

1955 births
Living people
American football linebackers
Texas A&M–Kingsville Javelinas football players
St. Louis Cardinals (football) players
Denver Gold players
Los Angeles Express players
San Antonio Gunslingers players
People from Victoria, Texas